Azteca diabolica is a species of ant in the genus Azteca. Described by Guerrero, Delabie and Dejean in 2010, the species is endemic to Panama.

References

Azteca (genus)
Hymenoptera of North America
Insects described in 2010